The Pensacola Barracudas were an arena football team based in Pensacola, Florida. They were an inaugural member of the AF2, the Arena Football League's developmental league. They played for three seasons, from 2000 to 2002, when they folded. They made one playoff appearance in their first year. They played their home games at the Pensacola Civic Center.

History
The Barracudas were one of the fifteen original teams to join the AF2 in its inaugural 2000 season. Pensacola originally played in the National Conference and won its first five games en route to the playoffs before losing to the eventual undefeated champion Quad City Steamwheelers. Prior to the 2001 season, the Barracudas moved to the American Conference.  They went 5-11 and missed the playoffs. After switching back to the National Conference in 2002, the Barracudas matched their first season's record by again finishing 8-8, but failed to make the playoffs again.  

The team folded after the 2002 season.  The team's turf was later used by the Wisconsin Wolfpack of the Continental Indoor Football League.

Season-by-season

|-
|2000 || 8 || 8 || 0 || 4th NC || Lost Round 1 (Quad City 55, Pensacola 19)
|-
|2001 || 5 ||  11  || 0 || 6th AC Southeast || --
|-
|2002 || 8 ||  8  || 0 || 3rd NC Southern || --
|-
!Totals || 21 || 28 || 0
|colspan="2"| (including af2 playoffs)
|}

Overall Win Percentage: .429

External links
 Pensacola Barracudas on ArenaFan.com

American football teams in Florida
Arena Football League in Florida
Defunct af2 teams
American football teams established in 2000
American football teams disestablished in 2002
2000 establishments in Florida
2002 disestablishments in Florida